Ambang Stadium is a multi-use stadium in Kotamobagu, North Sulawesi, Indonesia.  It is currently used mostly for football matches and is used as the home venue for Persibom Bolaang Mongondow. The stadium holds around 10,000 people.

References

Kotamobagu
Football venues in Indonesia
Buildings and structures in North Sulawesi
Persibom Bolaang Mongondow